Sir John Jervis White Jervis, 1st Baronet (1766–1830), originally John Jervis-White, was an Irish writer.

Life
The eldest son of John Jervis-White of Bally Ellis, County Wexford, barrister-at-law, he was born 10 June 1766, and graduated B.A. as a fellow-commoner at Trinity College, Dublin. He became barrister-at-law and graduated LL.D.

By royal licence, Jervis-White assumed the name of Jervis in addition to that of White, and was created a baronet of Ireland 10 November 1797, the first of the Jervis-White-Jervis baronets. This was a reward for having in the previous year raised a corps of volunteers in Ireland, whom he equipped at his own expense. After the breakdown of the Peace of Amiens in 1803 he again raised and equipped a corps, the Somerset Riflemen, from his home in Clifton, Bristol. He died in 1830.

Works
Jervis wrote:

 A Refutation of M. M. de Montgaillard's Calumnies against British Policy, and of his Display of the Situation of Great Britain in the year 1811, 1812. 
 A Brief View of the Past and Present State of Ireland, Bath, 1813. 
 A Brief Statement of the Rise, Progress, and Decline of the Ancient Christian Church, Dublin, 1813.

Family
Jervis was twice married, and was succeeded by his eldest surviving son, Sir Henry Meredyth Jervis White Jervis (1793–1869), who was a commander in the Royal Navy.

Notes

Attribution

1766 births
1830 deaths
Irish barristers
Irish writers
Baronets in the Baronetage of Ireland